Victoria Finlay is a British writer and journalist, known for her books on colour and jewels. Her most famous book is Colour: Travels Through The Paint Box.

Career
Finlay studied social anthropology at St Andrew's University, Scotland, and the College of William & Mary, Virginia, after which she joined Reuters. From 1991 to 2003 Finlay worked in Hong Kong as a journalist. By the time of the handover in 1997, she was arts editor of the South China Morning Post.

Finlay had become obsessed with colour as a child, when her father took her to Chartres Cathedral and said that people were no longer able to make the blue in the stained glass. In 2000, she decided it was time to go and find out this and other secrets of colour, and Colour: Travels through the Paintbox was published in 2002.

Finlay has also worked in radio presenting, and was the director of communications for the Alliance of Religions and Conservation.

Works
Colour: Travels Through The Paint Box published in North America as Color: A Natural History of the Palette
Buried Treasure published in the United States as Jewels: A Secret History.
Palmer, M and Finlay, V. (2003) Faith in Conservation; New Approaches to Religions and the Environment, Washington DC, The World BankFabric: The Hidden History of the Material World''

References

External links

British writers
British journalists
Living people
Year of birth missing (living people)